Phrynidius singularis is a species of beetle in the family Cerambycidae. It was described by Bates in 1880. It is known from Mexico, Guatemala, and Honduras.

References

Apomecynini
Beetles described in 1880